Joel of Dotawo was a king of the Christian kingdom of Dotawo in Nubia. His rule is documented from the year 1484.

Joel represents one of the last recorded kings of Christian Nubia. He is known from a graffiti in the Faras Cathedral, the inscription in the Church of Tamit, the letter from Jebel Adda (which is dated to 1484) and an inscription from a nearby church. This number of inscriptions and other references seems to be unusual, especially from times shortly before the Christian states in Nubia vanished. So Joel certainly seems to have had some significance; it is reported that he had at least one vassal: king Tienossi of Ilenat. His kingdom seems to have been conquered by the Mamluks under Qaitbay.

Notes

Literature
 Derek A. Welsby: The Medieval Kingdoms of Nubia. London 2002, pp. 250–251, 

African Christians
Nubian people
15th-century monarchs in Africa
History of Nubia